Bactris constanciae is a species of flowering plant in the family Arecaceae. It is found in Brazil, French Guiana, Guyana, and Suriname.

References

constanciae
Flora of the Amazon
Least concern plants
Taxonomy articles created by Polbot